Green Corps is an environmental organization in the United States that trains recent college graduates in a one-year post-graduate program in grassroots community organizing. During the program, Green Corps organizers learn in the classroom and are deployed in the field to work on campaigns.

Founding 

Green Corps was founded in 1992 by Leslie Samuelrich and Gina Cummings with the financial backing of U.S. Public Interest Research Group in response to the momentum created by Earth Day 1990. Green Corps was created to channel young talent into environmental advocacy causes.

Campaign history

Green Corps is hired by non-profits such as the Sierra Club to manage their campaigns in the field. Campaigns Green Corps has worked on include:
 Launching fossil fuel divestment campaigns on campuses.
 Launching a national campaign to label GMO foods.
 Leading the fights to shut coal plants on college campuses.

Funding 
In 2014, a donation of $200,000 was given by Green Corps to the Center for Public Interest Research, a 501(c)(3) nonprofit organization.

In 2015, Green Corps paid $240,480 to the Fund for the Public Interest for “program and fundraising support”.

Leadership

Executive Directors 
Executive Directors of Green Corps have included:

 1992 - 1994    Gina Collins Cummings
 1994 - 2004    Leslie Samuelrich
 2004 - 2008    Naomi Roth
 2008 - 2012    Cindy Kang
 2012 - 2017    Joshua Buswell-Charkow
 2017 – 2022    Annie Sanders
 2022 - present Renee Wellman

Board of Directors 

The current Green Corps Board of Directors includes:

 Douglas H. Phelps, President and Executive Director, The Public Interest Network
 Andy MacDonald, National Campus Organizing Director, Student PIRGs
 Leslie Samuelrich, President, Green Century Capital Management
 Wendy Wendlandt, Political Director, The Public Interest Network
 Naomi Roth, NRG Consulting Group
 Bernadette Del Chiaro, Executive Director, California Solar & Storage Association
 Mary Rafferty, Executive Director, Virginia Conservation Network

See also

References

External links 

 Official Website
 Board of Directors

Climate change organizations based in the United States
Nature conservation organizations based in the United States